Agios Petros (meaning Saint Peter) is a town in the municipal unit of Apollonioi in the southern part of the Lefkada Island in Greece.

There are many beaches nearby, with clear blue waters. The village houses are old, but well maintained, with landscaped gardens, which compose an impressive setting that fascinates visitors. The main occupations of the residents are tourism, fishing, livestock and olive trees cultivation.

Subdivisions

Agios Petros [2011 pop: 422]
Ponti Agiou Petrou (Πόντη Αγίου Πέτρου) [2011 pop: 126]

Population

Photos

See also

List of settlements in the Lefkada regional unit

References

External links
Agios Ilias on GTP Travel Pages (in English and Greek)

Populated places in Lefkada (regional unit)